Clix, CLIX, etc. may refer to:

Technology
 Clix (ISP), a Portuguese triple play brand
 CLiX (markup), a formal XML schema validation language and method of using valid XML for overlapping markup
 Clix (miniatures), a system of miniatures games produced by WizKids
 CLIX (Unix version), developed by Intergraph
 iriver clix, rebrand of the iriver U10, a multimedia player

Other
 CLIX, the number 159 in Roman numerals
 Clix Malt Liquor, a malt liquor